Conus admirationis is a species of sea snail, a marine gastropod mollusk in the family Conidae, the cone snails, cone shells or cones.

These snails are predatory and venomous. They are capable of "stinging" humans.

Description
The length  of the shell attains 60 mm.

Distribution
This marine species of cone snail is endemic to the  Philippines and occurs off the Sulu Island

References

 Poppe G.T. & Tagaro S.P. (2015). A spectacular new Conus (Conidae) from the Philippines. Visaya. 4(4): 71-75

External links
 

admirationis
Gastropods described in 2015